Oncostemum oliganthum is a species of flowering plant in the Primulaceae family. It is found in Madagascar.

References

Primulaceae
Endemic flora of Madagascar
Taxa named by John Gilbert Baker
Taxa named by Carl Christian Mez